Vera Brandes (Born 1956 in Cologne) is a German music producer and researcher in music and media effects.

Life and impact 

Brandes began to organize jazz concerts and tours at the age of fifteen, first and foremost a tour with Ronnie Scott's trio. In 1974 she organized the New Jazz in Cologne concert series in Cologne. The fifth concert in the series was the legendary "Köln Concert" by Keith Jarrett on January 24, 1975, which the pianist wanted to cancel because of an insufficient grand piano and fatigue. The concert took place only at the persistent urging of Brandes.

Brandes' first record label CMP - founded in 1977 with the concert promoter Kurt Renker - released albums by Nucleus, Charlie Mariano, Jeremy Steig and Theo Jörgensmann. In 1980 she founded the VeraBra label, where she worked as the sole producer and publisher. In 1984 she founded the Intuition label. 

Brandes produced and published more than 350 albums, including works by Reinhard Flatischler, The Lounge Lizards, Mikis Theodorakis, Barbara Thompson, Hermeto Pascoal and Andreas Vollenweider.

References

1956 births
German women record producers
Living people
Jazz record producers
Musicians from Cologne